Gymnasium Carolinum may refer to:

 Gymnasium Carolinum (Ansbach) 
 Gymnasium Carolinum (Osnabrück)